Aleiodes gaga is a species of parasitoid wasp belonging to the family Braconidae. It was first described by Donald Quicke and Buntika Butcher in 2012 after a single individual was discovered in the Chae Son National Park in  Thailand. The species is named after Lady Gaga. This species is one of 179 species identified by the first "turbo-taxonomic" search of DNA barcoding of cytochrome oxidase I (COI).

See also
 Gaga, a genus of ferns also named after Lady Gaga
 Gagadon, a fossil genus of prehistoric mammals also named after Lady Gaga
 List of organisms named after famous people (born 1950–present)

References

Braconidae
Insects of Thailand
Insects described in 2012
Lady Gaga
Species known from a single specimen